The 1921 San Diego mayoral election was held on April 5, 1921, to elect the mayor for San Diego. In the primary election, former mayor James E. Wadham and former City Councilmember John L. Bacon received the most votes and advanced to the runoff. Bacon was then elected mayor with a majority of the votes.

Candidates
John L. Bacon, former member of the San Diego City Council and Assistant City Manager
James E. Wadham, former Mayor of San Diego
Frank H. Heskett, attorney
Lewis R. Kirby
Charles A. Allen
Ludwig S. Gerlough
William I. Kinsley
Alfred L. Lee

Campaign
Incumbent Mayor Louis J. Wilde declined to stand for reelection, calling the position of mayor a thankless job. The main three candidates to succeed Wilde were former mayor James E. Wadham, former City Councilmember John L. Bacon, and attorney Frank H. Heskett.

On March 22, 1921, Wadham received the highest number of votes in the primary election, followed by Bacon, allowing both men to advance to the runoff. Heskett, who came in third and was therefore eliminated, actively supported Wadham for the runoff. On April 5, 1921, Bacon narrowly defeated Wadham by 82 votes out of 16,522. Wadham appealed to the superior court for a recount, but this did not change the outcome. Bacon therefore assumed the office of the mayor.

Primary Election results

General Election results

References

1921
1921 California elections
1921 United States mayoral elections
1921
April 1921 events